Boma or BOMA may refer to:

People 
 Boma Akpore, Nigerian actor
 Boma Iyaye (born 1969), Nigerian accountant and politician

Places 
 Boma, Democratic Republic of the Congo, a port city
 Boma Airport near Boma, Congo
 Boma, Ghana, a town
 Boma, Guinea
 Boma Plateau, a region of eastern South Sudan
 Boma State, a state of South Sudan
 Boma Upande, a settlement in Kenya's Coast Province
 Boma (Ponda), a village in the Ponda sub-district of Goa

Other uses 
 Boma clan, living in Nigeria
 Boma (enclosure), a rural fortress or livestock pen in Africa, from this also meaning a district government office or district center in countries which were British colonies in Africa
 Boma (administrative division), the smallest unit of local government in South Sudan
 Boma, an African style restaurant in hotel Disney's Animal Kingdom Lodge in Orlando, Florida
 Boma or Borma, a character in the science fiction manga Ghost in the Shell 
 Boma (Star Wars), a fictional creature in the Star Wars universe
 Building Owners and Managers Association (BOMA), a real estate industry group

See also 
 Bomas of Kenya, a tourist village in Langata, Nairobi